Judy Newman Rakela  (born May 11, 1962) is an American former professional tennis player.

A native of Santa Cruz, Newman was the second born of four children and attended Harbor High School. She studied at the University of San Diego on a tennis scholarship and played on tour after graduating in 1984.

Newman competed on the professional circuit until 1990, featuring on the WTA Tour and in grand slam qualifying.

Following her time on tour she earned a master's degree in sports psychology at John F. Kennedy University and plays on the ITF Senior circuit, where she has represented her country in World Championships.

ITF finals

Doubles: 1 (1–0)

References

External links
 
 

1962 births
Living people
American female tennis players
San Diego Toreros women's tennis players
Tennis people from California
Sportspeople from Santa Cruz, California
John F. Kennedy University alumni